On 30 November 2019, a shootout broke out in Villa Unión, Coahuila between a drug cartel, suspected to be the Cartel del Noreste, and police. Cartel forces attacked with a convoy of armed pickup trucks around noon. Villa Unión's town hall, the intended recipient of the attack, was targeted because it is the headquarters of the town's police force, leaving it badly damaged. Unverified videos showed smoke rising from the city. Vehicles were stolen and several civilians were kidnapped by the cartel during their retreat. In the following days, state forces pursued the cartels responsible for the attack, with 7 gang members killed on 1 December.

References

2019 mass shootings in Mexico
2019 murders in Mexico
21st century in Coahuila
Crime in Coahuila
Battles of the Mexican drug war
November 2019 crimes in North America
November 2019 events in Mexico
Violent non-state actor incidents in Mexico
Organized crime conflicts in Mexico
Organized crime events in Mexico